Bieńkówka  is a village in the administrative district of Gmina Budzów, within Sucha County, Lesser Poland Voivodeship, in southern Poland.

The village has a population of 2,300.

References

Villages in Sucha County